Elizabeth Ann (born December 10, 2020) is a black-footed ferret, the first U.S. endangered species to be cloned.

The animal was cloned using the frozen cells from Willa, a black-footed female ferret who died in the 1980s and had no living descendants.

Black-footed ferrets are the only ferret species native to the United States. The black-footed ferret is one of the most endangered and rarest land mammals in North America; a small pack of them was found in Wyoming in 1981. The limited genetic diversity found among the pack put the species at risk. Scientists sent genetic material from Willa to San Diego Zoo’s Frozen Zoo in 1988. Willa's egg was implanted in a surrogate domestic ferret in November 2020, to avoid putting an endangered ferret at risk. Elizabeth Ann was delivered via c-section on December 10.

The efforts were led by Revive & Restore, a biodiversity non-profit.

Elizabeth Ann will live in Colorado and be studied for scientific purposes; she will not be released into the wild. As of February 2022, Elizabeth Ann has reached puberty and scientists were looking for a viable mate.

Panel discussion, organized by the Draper Natural History Museum in October 2022, informed that Elizabeth Ann had a hysterectomy for unspecified reasons, but also that other clones were on their way.

References 

2020 animal births
Cloned animals